The New Home School Building is a historic school building in rural Jackson County, Arkansas.  Located on the north side of County Road 69, northwest of Swifton, it is a small single-story vernacular wood-frame building, with a gable roof and a Craftsman-style front porch on its southern facade.  The school was built c. 1915 as one of six rural single-room schoolhouses in the area surrounding Swifton, and is the best-preserved survivor of the group.

The building was listed on the National Register of Historic Places in 1992.

See also
National Register of Historic Places listings in Jackson County, Arkansas

References

School buildings on the National Register of Historic Places in Arkansas
One-room schoolhouses in Arkansas
School buildings completed in 1915
Buildings and structures in Jackson County, Arkansas
National Register of Historic Places in Jackson County, Arkansas
1915 establishments in Arkansas